Tomáš Dvořák, born 11 May 1972 in Gottwaldov (now Zlín), Czechoslovakia, is an athlete from the Czech Republic. He competed in the decathlon and heptathlon for the team Dukla Prague. He is a three-time decathlon world champion (1997, 1999, 2001) and a former world record holder (8,994 points scored in Prague, 1999), which is still the fifth best performance of all-time. This record was broken by Dvořák's compatriot Roman Šebrle in 2001. Dvořák is the only athlete to score over 8,900 points three times.

Dvořák announced his retirement in July 2008, after he failed to qualify for the Beijing Olympics. He now works as an athletic coach.

List of results 

1990 CRCJ (Czech Republic Championship of Juniors), Czechoslovakia, heptathlon, 1st
1990 WCJ, decathlon, 17th
1991 ECJ, decathlon, 2nd
1993 WC, Stuttgart (Germany), decathlon, 10th
1994 EIC, Paris (France), heptathlon, 4th
1994 EC, Helsinki (Finland), decathlon, 7th
1995 WIC, Barcelona (Spain), heptathlon, 2nd
1995 WC, Göteborg (Sweden), decathlon, 5th
1996 EIC, Stockholm (Sweden), heptathlon, 2nd
1996 OG, Atlanta (USA), decathlon, 3rd
1997 WC Athens, decathlon, 1st
1998 Goodwill Games, USA, decathlon, 3rd
1998 EIC, Valencia (Spain), heptathlon, 4th
1998 EC Budapest (Hungary), decathlon, 5th
1999 WC Seville, decathlon, 1st
1999 WIC, Maebashi, heptathlon, 4th
2000 EIC, heptathlon, 1st
2000 OG, Sydney (Australia), decathlon, 6th
2001 WC, decathlon, 1st
2001 Goodwill Games (Australia), decathlon, 1st
2002 EIC, Vienna (Austria), heptathlon, 2nd
2003 WIC, Birmingham (UK), heptathlon, 5th
2003 CRIC, Bratislava (Slovakia), 60 m hurdles, 1st
2003 CRIC, Bratislava (Slovakia), shot put, 3rd
2003 WC, Paris (France), decathlon, 4th
2004 CRIC, Praha, 60 m hurdles, 3rd, 7,94
2004 OG, Athens (Greece), decathlon, DNF
2005 WC, Helsinki (Finland), decathlon, 8th
2006 EC, Gothenburg (Sweden), decathlon, 12th

Personal bests 

 100 m 10.54 s
 Long jump 8.07 m
 Shot put 16.88 m
 High jump 2.09 m
 400 m 47.56 s
 110 m hurdles 13.61 s
 Discus throw 50.28 m
 Pole vault 5.00 m
 Javelin throw 72.32 m
 1500 m 4:27.69 min

Total: 9296 pts.

External links 

1972 births
Living people
Czech decathletes
Olympic bronze medalists for the Czech Republic
Athletes (track and field) at the 1996 Summer Olympics
Athletes (track and field) at the 2000 Summer Olympics
Athletes (track and field) at the 2004 Summer Olympics
Olympic athletes of the Czech Republic
World record setters in athletics (track and field)
Sportspeople from Zlín
World Athletics Championships medalists
Czech athletics coaches
Medalists at the 1996 Summer Olympics
Olympic bronze medalists in athletics (track and field)
Goodwill Games medalists in athletics
European Athlete of the Year winners
World Athletics Championships winners
Czech male athletes
Competitors at the 1998 Goodwill Games
Competitors at the 2001 Goodwill Games
Goodwill Games gold medalists in athletics